Steve W. Berman is an American plaintiff's lawyer and entrepreneur who founded and is Managing Partner of Hagens Berman Sobol Shapiro, a 76-attorney law firm based in Seattle, Washington.

Early life and education
Steve Berman was born in 1955 in Seattle, Washington, and was raised mostly in Highland Park, Illinois. His father ran an insurance company that sold policies for security guards and police officers. Berman was drafted into U.S. military service for the Vietnam War in 1972, but the war ended before Berman was sent to serve. Berman completed his undergraduate degree at the University of Michigan in 1976. He earned his Juris Doctor in law from the University of Chicago Law School in 1980.

Career

Early career
After graduating, Berman worked for Jenner & Block, then Shidler McBroom Gates & Lucas, which later became K&L Gates. He represented plaintiffs in some of the first sexual harassment lawsuits in Washington. His interest in class-action lawsuits began in 1989, after winning an $850 million settlement for investors that provided bonds for a failed nuclear power plant project. He then worked for Bernstein Litowitz Berger & Grossmann, who acted as co-counsel on the lawsuit, and later for Betts Patterson & Mines. At the time, he focused on shareholder lawsuits representing shareholders against big Seattle companies.

Hagens Berman and big tobacco
In 1993, Berman's employer decided not to take on a case against Jack in the Box for allegedly exaggerating to investors regarding the quality of the company's food before causing an e-coli outbreak. The law firm was worried taking the case would harm its relationships with insurance companies they help defend. In response, Berman left and started his own firm, Hagens Berman Sobol Shapiro LLP, with four partners and a few associates, so they could pursue the Jack in the Box case. The case settled two years later for $12 million. By 2014, Hagens Berman Sobol Shapiro LLP had 80 employees and 9 offices.

The law firm continued to use class-action lawsuits to target "social ills or corporate malfeasance." Berman became known for his work in the 1990s against big tobacco companies. At the time, most people believed tobacco companies could not be held liable for health problems associated with their products. After six years of litigation, where Berman represented 14 of 46 U.S. states that participated, the case was settled in 1996 for $206 billion. Washington CEO Magazine estimated he will receive a total of $100 million, while an article in the Irish Times estimated Berman's share was $10 million per-year for 25 years.

The firm suffered a setback in 2006 when it was ordered to pay $10.8 million to three small water-bottling companies in Maine. Hagens Berman had originally represented the bottlers in a lawsuit about water quality. But when the companies wanted to accept an out-of-court settlement offer, the law firm decided to instead pursue class action lawsuits over the objection of the bottlers. A jury found that the firm had been disloyal to its original clients.

Later work 
Berman has continued to pursue class-action lawsuits against large companies. He won a $215 million settlement from Enron related to lost employee pensions after the Enron scandal and $1.6 billion from Volkswagen related to the Volkswagen emissions scandal on behalf of car owners. He won $1.63 billion from Toyota related to sudden unintended acceleration in certain Toyota vehicles. Berman also sued the National Collegiate Athletic Association for their response to athlete concussions and for allegedly violating antitrust laws by prohibiting athletes from getting compensated. Berman has also sued pharmaceutical companies for alleged price-fixing, SeaWorld for its treatment of orcas, and the makers of Butterfinger for its alleged use of child labor.

In the late 2010s, Berman started lawsuits against big oil companies, accusing them of causing climate change, on behalf of coastal towns and others affected by rising water levels. The lawsuits use similar reasoning as the tobacco lawsuits in the 1990s, alleging oil companies willfully misled the public about the environmental harms of their product.

Personal life
Berman is married and has three children. He is a triathlete, cyclist, and a referee for youth soccer.

References

External links
biography - on firm website

Living people
University of Michigan alumni
University of Chicago Law School alumni
Washington (state) lawyers
Law firm founders
Year of birth missing (living people)